Fiji competed at the 2000 Summer Olympics in Sydney, Australia.

Athletics

Judo

Sailing

Swimming

Men

Women

Weightlifting

See also
 Fiji at the 2000 Summer Paralympics

References
Official Olympic Reports

Nations at the 2000 Summer Olympics
2000
Olympics